Sati-un-Nissa, also known as Sati-un-nisa, Sati al-Nisa Khanam, Sati-al-Nesāʾ (born in Amol before 1580 — died in Lahore, 23 January 1647) was an Indo-Persian physician, a lady-in-waiting to Mumtaz Mahal, mahaldar of Shah Jahan, and tutor to their daughters Jahanara Begum and Gauhar Ara Begum.

Life
Sati-un-Nissa was born in the Mazandaran province of Persia in a family of scholars and doctors. Taleb Amoli was her younger brother, while her maternal uncle was chief physician to the Safavid Shah Tahmasp I.

Little is known of her early life in Iran. She was likely born in or before 1580 as she is known to be older than Taleb whose birth is given around that year. Her brother had made his way to India, eventually becoming Emperor Jahangir's poet laureate (malek al-šoʿarā) in 1619. On his death in 1626 or 1627, Sati-un-Nissa adopted his two young daughters and brought them up as her own. There is a letter from Taleb to Jahangir asking permission to welcome his sister to India. Upon her husband Nasira's death in India, she joined the service of Mumtaz Mahal, the empress of Shah Jahan. With her knowledge of medicine and courtly etiquette, she was promoted to the head of the Empress' establishment, and named muhr-dar, the bearer of her seal. She was a tutor to Jahanara Begum, Mumtaz's daughter, whom she taught the Persian language. Under her tutelage, Jahanara became a respected poet. Sati-un-Nissa was an acclaimed reciter and teacher of Quran recitation.   

Sati-un-Nissa was appointed as Sadr-i-Nath, an officer in charge of grants to the needy, by Shah Jahan. In particular, she was responsible for the disbursement of support to indigent women, especially unwed virgins who needed dowry for marriage, and to answer petitions by widows, scholars and theologians. As mahaldar (or chief matron), she was expected to be the Emperor's eyes and ears in the imperial harem. She would read to him the reports received from the public (waqia-nawis) and private (khufyan-nawis) news writers, and respond to them on his dictation.

At Mumtaz Mahal's death during childbirth in 1631, Sati-un-Nissa escorted her body to Agra for burial. It is reported that Shah Jahan, bereft with grief, was unable to look on his newborn daughter, Gauhar Ara, who was then raised by Sati-un-Nissa.

Jahanara became the female head of the imperial family. As her chief assistant, Sati-un-Nissa was expected to convey presents to the brides of the royal princes. Returning with the gifts from the brides' families, she organised displays of the amassed gifts in public exhibitions at Agra Fort.

Her younger daughter died from complications following childbirth. A broken-hearted Sati-un-Nissa did not recover from this grief, and died a few days later in Lahore on 23 January 1647. Shah Jahan ordered Rupees 10,000 to be spent on her funeral. A year later, her body was moved to Agra to be interred in a tomb built especially for her, near the outer quadrangle of the Taj Mahal. The tomb is extant today, east of the Fatehpuri Mosque and southwest of the Taj's forecourt.

In popular culture
Nina Epton's novel Beloved Empress, Mumtaz Mahal is written from the point of view of Sati-un-Nissa. She also appears in Kathryn Lasky's Jahanara, Princess of Princesses.

References

Bibliography

 

17th-century Iranian physicians
17th-century Indian medical doctors
People from Amol
Iranian emigrants to the Mughal Empire
Indian Shia Muslims
17th-century Indian women
17th-century Indian people
Quran reciters